Richard Delancey is the hero of a series of novels by historian C. Northcote Parkinson.
Delancey is a citizen of the Island of Guernsey who rises, through merit, through the Royal Navy,
during its late 18th Century wars with America and France.

According to Charles K. Rowley, during his retirement, in Guernsey, Parkinson lived on a street named a real life hero named Richard Delancey, a military officer who served under the 1st Duke of Wellington, and who died during the Battle of Waterloo.

James A. Winnefeld, writing in the Naval War College Review, wrote that Parkinson had "the naval historian's eye and ear for time and place".  However, he said his characters were "wooden".

References

Literary characters introduced in 1973
Characters in British novels of the 20th century
Fictional sailors